Elections to High Peak Borough Council in Derbyshire, England were held on 1 May 2003. All of the council was up for election and the control of the council changed from Labour control to no overall control. Boundary changes since the 1999 local elections reduced the number of seats by 1, and meant that all wards had changed boundaries, with the exception of Whaley Bridge ward.

After the election, the composition of the council was:
Labour 18
Conservative 12
Liberal Democrat 7
Independent 4
Glossop Independent Party 2

Election result

Ward results

References

2003
2003 English local elections
2000s in Derbyshire